Michel Jungblut (28 May 1887 – 27 October 1977) was a Luxembourgian sculptor. His work was part of the sculpture event in the art competition at the 1932 Summer Olympics.

References

1887 births
1977 deaths
20th-century Luxembourgian sculptors
Luxembourgian sculptors
Olympic competitors in art competitions
People from Remich